is a Japanese football player. She plays for Urawa Reds. She played for Japan national team.

Club career
After graduating from high school, she joined TEPCO Mareeze in 2008. However, the club was disbanded for Fukushima Daiichi nuclear disaster in 2011. In June, she moved to Nippon TV Beleza. In 2012, she moved to new club Vegalta Sendai. In 2013, she was selected Best Eleven. In 2015, she moved to Urawa Reds.

National team career
In November 2008, Osafune was selected Japan U-20 national team for 2008 U-20 World Cup. On January 13, 2010, she debuted for Japan national team against Denmark. She was a member of Japan for 2010 Asian Games and Japan won the championship. She played 15 games and scored 2 goals for Japan until 2015.

Club statistics

National team statistics

International goals

References

External links

1989 births
Living people
Association football people from Osaka Prefecture
People from Toyonaka, Osaka
Japanese women's footballers
Japan women's international footballers
Nadeshiko League players
TEPCO Mareeze players
Nippon TV Tokyo Verdy Beleza players
Mynavi Vegalta Sendai Ladies players
Urawa Red Diamonds Ladies players
Asian Games medalists in football
Asian Games gold medalists for Japan
Asian Games silver medalists for Japan
Footballers at the 2010 Asian Games
Footballers at the 2014 Asian Games
Women's association football defenders
Medalists at the 2010 Asian Games
Medalists at the 2014 Asian Games